Progress MS-22, Russian production No.452, identified by NASA as Progress 83P, is a Progress spaceflight launched by Roscosmos to resupply the International Space Station (ISS). It is the 175th flight of a Progress spacecraft.

History 
The Progress-MS is an uncrewed freighter based on the Progress-M featuring improved avionics. This improved variant first launched on 21 December 2015. It has the following improvements:

 New external compartment that enables it to deploy satellites. Each compartment can hold up to four launch containers. First time installed on Progress MS-03.
 Enhanced redundancy thanks to the addition of a backup system of electrical motors for the docking and sealing mechanism.
 Improved Micrometeoroid (MMOD) protection with additional panels in the cargo compartment.
 Luch Russian relay satellites link capabilities enable telemetry and control even when not in direct view of ground radio stations.
 GNSS autonomous navigation enables real time determination of the status vector and orbital parameters dispensing with the need of ground station orbit determination.
 Real time relative navigation thanks to direct radio data exchange capabilities with the space station.
 New digital radio that enables enhanced TV camera view for the docking operations.
 Unified Command Telemetry System (UCTS) replaces previous Ukrainian Chezara Kvant-V as the Progress spacecraft's on-board radio and antenna/feeder system.
 Replacement of the Kurs A with Kurs NA digital system.

Launch 
A Soyuz-2.1a launched Progress MS-22 to the International Space Station from Baikonur Site 31 on 9 February 2023. Around 2 days after the launch, Progress MS-22 automatically docked with Zvezda and continues its mission, supporting Expedition 69 aboard the ISS.

Cargo 
Dry cargo: 
Fuel: 
Compressed air: 
Water:

See also 
 Uncrewed spaceflights to the International Space Station

References 

Progress (spacecraft) missions
2023 in Russia
Spacecraft launched in 2023
Supply vehicles for the International Space Station
Spacecraft launched by Soyuz-2 rockets